Sea-Bow may refer to:

 Sea-Bow International, a Canadian aircraft manufacturer 
 Sea-Bow International Sea-Bow, the aircraft they build